Reinsvoll Station is located on the Gjøvik Line at Reinsvoll in Vestre Toten, Norway.

The station was opened on 23 December 1901 as Reinsvolden. From 28 November 1902 it was renamed Reinsvold, and from April 1921 it received the current name. Until 1987, it also served as the terminal station of the Skreia Line. It has a waiting room with limited open hours.

External links 
  Entry at Jernbaneverket <
 Entry at the Norwegian Railway Club 

Railway stations in Oppland
Railway stations on the Gjøvik Line
Railway stations opened in 1901
1901 establishments in Norway
Vestre Toten